Bioethics research, education, and service provision have, since the 1970s, been focused in research centers or Research institutes. While the founding centers of bioethics scholarship are North American, notably The Hastings Center and the Kennedy Institute of Ethics in the US, over subsequent decades many others such centers have emerged globally. Note that some of these centers have also been involved in hosting scholarly and professional journals (List of bioethics journals) and participating in bioethics education (List of masters programs in bioethics, List of doctoral programs in bioethics).

Africa

Cameroon 
 Institut Africain de Bioéthique

Nigeria 
 Center for Bioethics and Research

Asia

China / Hong Kong 
Centre for Applied Ethics

Australasia

Australia 
 Adelaide Centre for Bioethics and Culture
Centre for Human Bioethics
 Monash Bioethics Centre, Monash University

New Zealand 
 Bioethics Centre, University of Otago
 Eubios Ethics Institute

Europe

Belgium 
 Centre for Biomedical Ethics and Law, KU Leuven
 Centre de Bioéthique, Université de Namur

Bulgaria 
 Bulgarian Center for Bioethics

France 
 Centre d’Éthique Médicale--ETHICS 7446, Université Catholique de Lille

Germany 
 Abteilung für Medizinische Ethik und Geschichte der Medizin, Ruhr-Universität
 Akademie für Ethik in der Medizin
 Institut Mensch, Ethik und Wissenschaft
 Institut für Deutsches, Europäisches und Internationales Medizinrecht, Gesundheitsrecht und Bioethik, Universitäten Heidelberg und Mannheim
 Institut für Ethik, Geschichte und Theorie der Medizin, Ludwig Maximillian Universität München
 Institut für Ethik, Geschichte und Philosophie der Medizin, Medizinische Hochschule Hannover
 Institut für Ethik und Geschichte der Medizin, Universitätsmedizin Göttingen
 Zentrum für Ethik in der Medizin am Agaplesion Markus Krankenhaus

Netherlands 
 Ethics Institute, Utrecht University
 Health Ethics and Society, Maastricht University

Norway 
 Centre for Medical Ethics, University of Oslo
 Bergen Centre for Ethics and Priority Setting, University of Bergen

Poland 
 Center for Bioethics and Biolaw, Uniwersytet Warszawski
 Interdisciplinary Centre for Ethics, Jagiellonian University

Portugal 
 Institute of Bioethics, Catholic University of Portugal

Serbia 
Center for the Study of Bioethics

Slovak Republic 
 Institute of Medical Ethics and Bioethics, Slovakia Medical University

Spain 
 Institut Borja de Bioètica, Ramon Llull University
 Instituto de Ética Clínica Francisco Vallés, Universidad Europea
 Observatorio de Bioética y Derecho, Universitat de Barcelona

Sweden 
 Centre for Research Ethics & Bioethics (CRB), Uppsala University

Switzerland 
 Interdisciplinary Institute for Ethics in Health Care
 Institute for Biomedical Ethics, University of Basel
 Institute of Biomedical Ethics and History of Medicine, University of Zurich

United Kingdom 
 Anscombe Bioethics Centre
 Centre for Ethics in Medicine, University of Bristol
 Centre for Bioethics & Emerging Technologies, St Mary’s University
 Centre of Professional Ethics, University of Central Lancashire
 Ethox Centre, University of Oxford
Future of Humanity Institute
Oxford Uehiro Center for Practical Ethics
 Wellcome Centre for Ethics and Humanities, University of Oxford

Middle East

Lebanon 
 Salim El-Hoss Bioethics and Professionalism Program, American University of Beirut

North America

Canada 
 Biomedical Ethics Unit, McGill University
 Canadian Catholic Bioethics Institute, University of St Michael's College, University of Toronto
 Centre of Genomics and Policy, McGill University
 Centre for Health Care Ethics, Lakehead University
 Centre for Health Law Ethics and Policy, University of Ottawa
 Centre for Professional and Applied Ethics, University of Manitoba
 Centre on Values and Ethics, Carleton University
 Institute for Science, Society and Policy, University of Ottawa
 John Dossetor Health Ethics Centre, University of Alberta
 Joint Centre for Bioethics, University of Toronto
 Centre for Clinical Ethics, Providence Healthcare
 Department of Bioethics, Dalhousie University
National Core for Neuroethics
 Pragmatic Health Ethics Research Unit, IRCM
 W. Maurice Young Centre for Applied Ethics, University of British Columbia
 York Collegium for Public Ethics, York University

United States 
Albert Gnaegi Center for Health Care Ethics, Saint Louis University
Alden March Bioethics Institute, Albany Medical College
 Bioethics Center, Children's Mercy
 Bioethics Center for Community Health And Genomic Equity, Case Western Reserve University
 Bioethics Center, Hofstra University
 Center for Bioethics, Cedarville University
 Center for Bioethics, Cleveland Clinic
 Center for Bioethics, Concordia University Wisconsin
 Center for Bioethics, Harvard Medical School
 Center for Bioethics, Indiana University
 Center for Bioethics, New York University
 Center for Bioethics, University of Minnesota
 Center for Bioethics, University of North Carolina
 Center for Bioethics and Humanities, University of Colorado
 Center for Bioethics and Humanities, SUNY Upstate Medical University
Center for Bioethics and Medical Humanities, University of Mississippi Medical Center
 Center for Bioethics and Medical Humanities, Medical College of Wisconsin
 Center for Bioethics and Social Science in Medicine, University of Michigan
 Center for Bioethics and Social Justice, Michigan State University 
 Center for Biomedical Ethics and Society, Vanderbilt University Medical Center
Center for Children, Law, and Ethics
 Center for Ethics, Emory University
 Center for Ethics in Health Care, Oregon Health & Science University
Center for Genetics and Society
 Center for Global Ethics & Politics, Ralph Bunche Institute
 Center for Global Health Ethics, Duquesne University
 Center for Health Ethics and Law, West Virginia University
 Center for Health Humanities & Ethics, University Virginia
 Center for Medical Ethics and Health Policy, Baylor College of Medicine
 Center for Practical Bioethics
 Center for the Study of Ethics in Society, Western Michigan University
Cumberland School of Law's Center for Biotechnology, Law, and Ethics
 Center for Urban Bioethics, Temple University
 Department of Bioethics & Humanities, University of Washington
 Department of Medical History & Bioethics, University of Wisconsin
 Edmund D. Pellegrino Center for Clinical Bioethics, Georgetown University Medical Center
 Ethics Institute, Dartmouth College
The Hastings Center 
 Institute for Bioethics & Health Humanities, University of Texas Medical Branch
Institute for Ethics and Emerging Technologies
Johns Hopkins Berman Institute of Bioethics
Kennedy Institute of Ethics
MacLean Center for Clinical Medical Ethics
Maguire Center for Ethics
 Montefiore Einstein Center for Bioethics
National Catholic Bioethics Center
 Neiswanger Institute for Bioethics, Loyola University
 Providence Center for Health Care Ethics
 Romanell Center for Clinical Ethics and the Philosophy of Medicine, University at Buffalo
 Stanford Center for Biomedical Ethics
Tuskegee University#National Center for Bioethics in Research and Health Care
Yale Interdisciplinary Center for Bioethics

References 

 
Bioethics